Tanya Boyd (born March 20, 1951) is an American actress who is best known for her role as Celeste Perrault on Days of Our Lives.

Boyd's passion for acting led her to New York City and after several years of studying, she moved to Los Angeles, to pursue her dreams. Her early acting career included roles in the hit TV miniseries Roots (1977), and blaxploitation films such as Black Shampoo (1976) and Black Heat (1976).

Boyd performed by traveling the world as a back-up vocalist with such well-known artists as Anita Baker, Lou Rawls, Bobby Lyle and Natalie Cole. In 1979, she became a member of the vocal group The 5th Dimension, replacing Pat Bass. Boyd's passion was acting, and she soon realized how much she missed it, so she returned to Los Angeles to continue her acting career. Since then, she has acted in various theatre productions, and has directed festival productions and comedies. She would like to become a film director someday.

Boyd was married to Bobby Lyle from 1994 to 1997.

Acting Roles
Days of Our Lives as Celeste Perrault (1994–1999 main, 1999–2007 recurring)
For da Love of Money as Ms. Anderson (2002)
The Good News as Joanne (two episodes, 1997)
Under One Roof as Ava (1995)
The Disappearance of Christina as Banker (1993)
Tricks of the Trade (TV movie) as Beverly (1988)
Jo Jo Dancer, Your Life Is Calling (1986) as Alicia (1986)
The Twilight Zone as Melissa Parker (one episode, 1987)
Wholly Moses! as Princess (1980)
The Happy Hooker Goes Hollywood as Sylvie (1980)
Murder Can Hurt You as Stunner (1980)
Walking Through the Fire as Nurse Gales (1979)
The Ted Knight Show as Philadelphia Phil Brown (six episodes, 1978)
Good Times as Valerie Johnson (one episode, 1978)
Roots as Genelva (1977)
Black Heat as Stephanie (1976)
Black Shampoo as Brenda St. John (1976)
Ilsa, Harem Keeper of the Oil Sheiks as Satin (1976)

Awards
Drama-Logue Critics Award for Best Performance (Indigo Blues - 1993)

References

External links

1951 births
Living people
African-American actresses
American soap opera actresses
American television actresses
21st-century African-American people
21st-century African-American women
20th-century African-American people
20th-century African-American women